Elections to Magherafelt District Council were held on 7 June 2001 on the same day as the other Northern Irish local government elections. The election used three district electoral areas to elect a total of 16 councillors.

Election results

Note: "Votes" are the first preference votes.

Districts summary

|- class="unsortable" align="centre"
!rowspan=2 align="left"|Ward
! % 
!Cllrs
! % 
!Cllrs
! %
!Cllrs
! %
!Cllrs
! % 
!Cllrs
!rowspan=2|TotalCllrs
|- class="unsortable" align="center"
!colspan=2 bgcolor="" | Sinn Féin
!colspan=2 bgcolor="" | DUP
!colspan=2 bgcolor="" | SDLP
!colspan=2 bgcolor="" | UUP
!colspan=2 bgcolor="white"| Others
|-
|align="left"|Magherafelt Town
|bgcolor="#008800"|34.7
|bgcolor="#008800"|2
|30.6
|2
|21.0
|1
|13.7
|1
|0.0
|0
|6
|-
|align="left"|Moyola
|bgcolor="#008800"|42.5
|bgcolor="#008800"|2
|20.9
|1
|15.8
|1
|17.8
|1
|3.0
|0
|5
|-
|align="left"|Sperrin
|bgcolor="#008800"|56.0
|bgcolor="#008800"|3
|9.6
|0
|22.6
|1
|0.0
|0
|11.8
|1
|5
|- class="unsortable" class="sortbottom" style="background:#C9C9C9"
|align="left"| Total
|44.2
|7
|20.6
|3
|19.9
|3
|10.4
|2
|4.9
|1
|16
|-
|}

District results

Magherafelt Town

1997: 2 x Sinn Féin, 2 x DUP, 1 x SDLP, 1 x UUP
2001: 2 x Sinn Féin, 2 x DUP, 1 x SDLP, 1 x UUP
1997-2001 Change: No change

Moyola

1997: 2 x Sinn Féin, 1 x DUP, 1 x UUP, 1 x SDLP
2001: 2 x Sinn Féin, 1 x DUP, 1 x UUP, 1 x SDLP
1997-2001 Change: No change

Sperrin

1997: 2 x Sinn Féin, 2 x SDLP, 1 x UUP
2001: 3 x Sinn Féin, 1 x SDLP, 1 x Independent
1997-2001 Change: DUP gain from Independent

References

Magherafelt District Council elections
Magherafelt